Lucy Maria Powell (born 10 October 1974) is a British politician serving as Shadow Secretary of State for Digital, Culture, Media and Sport since 2021. A member of the Labour and Co-operative parties, she has been Member of Parliament (MP) for Manchester Central since 2012.

Prior to her election, she worked in campaigning and PR roles for Britain in Europe, NESTA and the Labour Party. She was a shadow Cabinet Office minister and vice-chair for the 2015 general election campaign. 
She was appointed Shadow Secretary of State for Education in September 2015, but resigned in June 2016. She served as Shadow Minister for Business and Consumers from April 2020 to May 2021, and Shadow Secretary of State for Housing from May to November 2021.

Early life
Powell was born in Moss Side. She attended Beaver Road Primary School and Parrs Wood High School in the suburb of Didsbury, and then studied for A-levels at Xaverian College. She studied Chemistry at Somerville College, Oxford, and King's College London.

Political career

Powell began her career working as a parliamentary assistant for Beverley Hughes MP, after having worked at the Labour Party Headquarters in Millbank Tower during the 1997 general election campaign.

She joined the pro-Euro and pro-EU Treaty pressure group Britain in Europe (BiE), originally in a public relations role and later as head of regional campaigning. She replaced Simon Buckby as Campaign Director of BiE. In this capacity, she worked with Chris Patten, Neil Kinnock, Nick Clegg and Danny Alexander.

After Britain in Europe was wound down in June 2005 because of the referendum "No" votes in France and the Netherlands, she worked for the non-departmental public body or quango NESTA (the National Endowment for Science, Technology and the Arts), initially in a public affairs role and later to establish and manage the Manchester Innovation Fund project.

She was selected as prospective parliamentary candidate for Manchester Withington in April 2007. She failed to defeat  the incumbent Liberal Democrat, John Leech at the 2010 general election.

From May 2010 to September 2010 Powell managed Ed Miliband's successful campaign for the Labour Party leadership. She then served as Miliband's acting and later deputy chief of staff from September 2010 to April 2012. She was selected by the local Constituency Labour Party (CLP) in April 2012 for the upcoming Manchester Central by-election, defeating local councillors Mike Amesbury (who became an MP in 2017) and Rosa Battle and the London councillor Patrick Vernon. 

The by-election was triggered by Tony Lloyd, who stepped down as its MP to contest the 2012 England and Wales Police and Crime Commissioner elections for Greater Manchester Police area.

Member of Parliament (2012–present)
Powell was elected at the Manchester Central by-election held in November 2012. She won the election with a majority of 9,936 votes. 

Voter turnout of 18.2% at the by-election is believed to be the lowest in a by-election since the Second World War. Powell became Manchester's first female Labour member of parliament and the first woman elected from Manchester since 1964.

Powell first joined the opposition front-bench in October 2013 as Shadow Childcare and Early Years Minister, and entered the Shadow Cabinet in November 2014 as Shadow Cabinet Office Minister.

Powell was appointed vice-chair of the 2015 general election campaign by Ed Miliband, in which Labour suffered a net loss of 26 seats, including a net loss of 40 seats in Scotland. She was heavily criticised for apparently suggesting that Labour's election pledges were liable to be broken: in talking about the so-called EdStone, she commented: "I don't think anyone is suggesting that the fact that he's carved them into stone means that he is absolutely not going to break them or anything like that." She said that she had been quoted out of context. She was responsible for Ed Miliband's interview with Russell Brand, described as a PR blunder. As a result of these actions coupled to the result, Tanya Gold, writing for The Sunday Times, described her as "discredited". In response to the result, Powell stated, "I bear my share of responsibility in this".

In the 2015 Labour Party leadership election, she nominated Andy Burnham.

Powell was appointed as Shadow Education Secretary on 13 September 2015 by Jeremy Corbyn, succeeding Tristram Hunt. As Shadow Education Secretary, she argued for bringing free schools and academies under Local Education Authority control. She resigned from the Shadow Cabinet on 26 June 2016, along with dozens of shadow cabinet colleagues unhappy with Corbyn's leadership. She supported Owen Smith in the 2016 Labour leadership election. However, she later stated that, "We were wrong about Jeremy Corbyn" in an interview following the 2017 general election.

In September 2017, the political commentator Iain Dale placed Powell at Number 81 in The 100 Most Influential People on the Left.

In September 2018, Powell introduced legislation in the House of Commons to ban secret, private, invite-only groups on Facebook and hold moderators legally responsible for hate speech or defamation on forums. She is a member of Labour Friends of Israel.

On 9 April 2020, Powell rejoined the Labour front bench when she was appointed as the Shadow Minister for Business and Consumers by new party leader Keir Starmer. In a minor reshuffle in May 2021, she was promoted to the Shadow Cabinet as the Shadow Secretary of State for Housing, succeeding Thangam Debbonaire. 

In the November 2021 shadow cabinet reshuffle, Powell was appointed Shadow Secretary of State for Digital, Culture, Media and Sport.

Personal life
Powell is married to James Williamson, an emergency medicine doctor, and has three children – a step-son, a daughter, and a son who was born on 27 May 2013.

She supports Manchester City football club.

Notes

References

External links

Lucy Powell Twitter account
articles by Lucy Powell at The Guardian

|-

|-

1974 births
Living people
Alumni of King's College London
Alumni of Somerville College, Oxford
Labour Co-operative MPs for English constituencies
Female members of the Parliament of the United Kingdom for English constituencies
Labour Party (UK) officials
Labour Friends of Israel
People educated at Parrs Wood High School
People from Moss Side
Politicians from Manchester
UK MPs 2010–2015
UK MPs 2015–2017
UK MPs 2017–2019
UK MPs 2019–present
21st-century British women politicians
21st-century English women
21st-century English people